Ingalgi  is a village in the southern state of Karnataka, India. It is located in the Chitapur taluk of Kalaburagi district in Karnataka.

Demographics
As of 2001 India census, Ingalgi had a population of 5122 with 2584 males and 2538 females.

See also
 Gulbarga
 Districts of Karnataka

References

External links
 http://Gulbarga.nic.in/

Villages in Kalaburagi district